Palette may refer to:

 Cosmetic palette, an archaeological form
 Palette, another name for a color scheme
 Palette (painting), a wooden board used for mixing colors for a painting
 Palette knife, an implement for painting
 Palette (company), a Japanese visual novel studio (video game company)
 Palette (computing), in computer graphics, another name given to a color lookup table
 Palette (freeware game), a Japanese-language freeware adventure game
 Palette window, in computing, a window type often containing tools
 Palette valve, the valve under an organ pipe which is connected to the keyboard(s), —as opposed to the stop valve
 Palette, a village in the commune Le Tholonet, in the Provence region of southern France
 Palette AOC, a wine Appellation d'Origine Contrôlée located in the aforementioned village
 Palette Records, a record label
 Palette (album), by IU, 2017
 "Palette" (song), the title song
 Palette (EP), by Nobuhiko Okamoto, 2012
 Toyota Palette, a vehicle made by Toyota
 Toyota e-Palette, a concept bus made by Toyota

See also
Palate, the roof of the mouth
Pallet, a holder for goods for use with a forklift
Pallet (disambiguation), for other uses